Erigeron neomexicanus, the New Mexico fleabane, is a plant species native to New Mexico, Arizona, Sonora, and Chihuahua. It occurs in open sites in grasslands or woodlands, at elevations of 900–3000 m (3000–9000 m).

Erigeron neomexicanus is a perennial herb with a fairly large taproot. Leaves are fairly large and oblanceolate, with  pinnate lobes, the basal leaves up to 6 cm (2.4 inches) long. Cauline (stem) leaves progressively smaller higher up the stem. Ray and disc flowers are both white.

References

neomexicanus
Flora of Arizona
Flora of New Mexico
Flora of Sonora
Flora of Chihuahua (state)
Plants described in 1883